Matthew Tarullo (born August 13, 1982, in Albany, New York) is an American football guard and center free agent in the National Football League.  

He was signed as an undrafted free agent out of Syracuse University. He has never played a down in an official NFL game.  Tarullo was released from the Dallas Cowboys in 2006 and picked up by the New York Giants to participate on the practice squad. 

He is currently coaching football and wrestling at his alma mater, Colonie Central High School.

1982 births
Living people
Sportspeople from Albany, New York
American football offensive guards
American football centers
Syracuse Orange football players
Dallas Cowboys players
New York Giants players